Ami McKay (born 1968) is an American Canadian novelist, playwright and journalist.

McKay was born in Lebanon, Indiana, but now lives with her husband and two sons on the Bay of Fundy. She began her writing career as a freelancer for CBC Radio. Her work has aired on Maritime Magazine, Outfront, This Morning and The Sunday Edition. Her documentary, Daughter of Family G  won an Excellence in Journalism Medallion at the 2003 Atlantic Journalism Awards. She was a finalist in the Writers' Union of Canada's Short Prose Competition as well as the recipient of a grant from the Nova Scotia Department of Tourism, Culture and Heritage.

The Birth House was McKay's first published effort and reached the Number One spot on Canadian best sellers lists. Her second novel, The Virgin Cure, was published in 2012.

Her first script for the stage, Jerome: The Historical Spectacle was commissioned by Two Planks and a Passion Theatre Company and was staged at The Ross Creek Centre for the Arts, directed by Ken Schwartz in August 2008.

Awards and recognition
2012 - Established Artist Recognition Award—Creative Nova Scotia Leadership Council / Province of Nova Scotia
2012 - Atlantic Independent Booksellers' Association "Bookseller's Choice of the Year" award for The Virgin Cure
2010 - One of the five finalists in CBC's Canada Reads. Her book is championed by TV host and designer Debbie Travis.
2009 - Robert Meritt Award (co-winner with Allen Cole) for Outstanding Sound Design or Original Score for the 2008 production of Jerome: The Historical Spectacle produced by Two Planks and Passion Theatre Company
Feb 2008 - 2007 Evergreen Award. Presented by the Ontario Librarian's Assoc.
Nov 2007 - Longlisted for the Dublin IMPAC Award
June 2007 - Libris Awards for Best Author and Best Fiction Book of 2007. Presented by the Canadian Booksellers Association
May 2007 - Bookseller's Choice Award at the Atlantic Book Awards
March 2004 - Second Place in The H.R.(Bill) Percy Prize for Unpublished Novel by the Writer's Federation of Nova Scotia.
January 2003 Finalist in the Writers' Union of Canada Short Prose Competition, Illumination
April 2003 Gabriel Award Nomination, Daughter of Family G
May 2003 Atlantic Journalism Awards - Excellence in Journalism Award (Finalist in the Feature Writing for Radio Category, Daughter of Family G)
October 2003 - Daughter of Family G was selected to air on Soundprint, and aired on National Public Radio stations throughout the U.S.
November 2002 - May 2003 Apprentice in the WFNS Mentorship Program Paired with Richard Cumyn

Writing credits
Half Spent was the Night: : A Witches' Yuletide Published by Knopf (Canada)
The Witches of New York Published by Knopf (Canada), HarperCollins (US), Orion (UK)
The Virgin Cure: A Novel Published by Knopf(Canada), HarperCollins (US), Orion (UK), Neri Pozza (Italy - de casa della vergini)
Jerome: The Historical Spectacle [play] Published by Gaspereau Press 2008. First staged by Two Planks and Passion Theatre Company 1 Aug - 17 Aug 2008 at the Ross Creek Centre for the Arts.
The Birth House: A Novel Published by Knopf (Canada), 4th Estate (UK), Harper Collins (US), also in the Netherlands, Germany, Spain (La Casa de la Luna) and Lithuania (Gimdymo namai, published by Vaga)
Christ on a Bike, Short Story, Room of One's Own Magazine
Daughter of Family G, Feature Documentary for CBC Radio's The Sunday Edition. Published in book form in September 2019 by Knopf (Canada).
Kitchen Ghosts, Feature Documentary for CBC Radio's Outfront
The Midwife House, Feature Webumentary for CBC Radio's Outfront
From Smart Girl to Scat Girl, Feature Documentary for CBC Radio's Outfront
Learning to Box, Personal Essay for CBC Radio's First Person Singular

Affiliations
The Writers Federation of Nova Scotia - Writer's Council Member
PEN Canada & the PEN Canada Rapid Action Network
Writing Fellow at the Ross Creek Centre for the Arts

See also

List of Canadian writers

References

External links

"Ami McKay" in The Canadian Encyclopedia

1968 births
Living people
Canadian non-fiction writers
Canadian radio personalities
Canadian women novelists
20th-century Canadian novelists
20th-century Canadian women writers
Canadian women non-fiction writers